Frangipane is a sweet almond-flavored custard used in a variety of ways including cakes and such pastries as the Bakewell tart, conversation tart, Jésuite and pithivier. A French spelling from a 1674 cookbook is franchipane with the earliest modern spelling coming from a 1732 confectioners' dictionary. Originally designated as a custard tart flavored by almonds or pistachios it came later to designate a filling that could be used in a variety of confections and baked goods.

It is traditionally made by combining two parts of almond cream (crème d’amande) with one part pastry cream (crème pâtissière). Almond cream is made from butter, sugar, eggs, almond meal, bread flour, and rum; and pastry cream is made from whole milk, vanilla bean, cornstarch, sugar, egg yolks or whole eggs, and butter. There are many variations on both of these creams as well as on the proportion of almond cream to pastry cream in frangipane. 

In some anecdotes it was the kind of sweet that the noblewoman Jacopa da Settesoli brought to St. Francis of Assisi in 1226, when he was dying. The “almond sweet” might also be a Roman version of mustacciuoli.

On Epiphany, the French cut the king cake, a round cake made of frangipane layers into slices to be distributed by a child known as le petit roi (the little king) who is usually hiding under the dining table. The cake is decorated with stars, a crown, flowers and a special bean hidden inside the cake. Whoever gets the piece of the frangipane cake with the bean is crowned "king" or "queen" for the following year.

Etymology 
The word comes ultimately from Italian, named after Marquis Muzio Frangipani or Cesare Frangipani. The word first denoted the frangipani plant, from which was produced the perfume originally said to flavor frangipane. Other sources say that the name as applied to the almond custard was an homage by 16th-century Parisian chefs in name only to Frangipani, who created a jasmine-based perfume with a smell like the flowers to perfume leather gloves. A few popular sources claim that an Italian nobleman invented the dish himself while at the court of Louis XIII.

See also

 List of almond dishes
 List of custard desserts
 List of pastries

References

Bibliography
 "Frangipane." Oxford Companion to Food (1999), 316.

Almond dishes
Food ingredients
Custard desserts